Fu'ad Aït Aattou (born 2 November 1980) is a French actor and model of Moroccan and French descent.

Biography 
Fu'ad Aït Aattou was born on 2 November 1980. Aït Aattou's father is of Moroccan Berber origin, while his mother is of French origin. He spent his childhood in the North of France, then moved to Paris to attend a school of dramatic art for three years. He worked as a model and went to acting auditions. In 2007, he played the lead in The Last Mistress opposite Asia Argento and Roxane Mesquida after he was discovered by director Catherine Breillat in a Paris café.

Filmography

References

External links
 
 
 

1980 births
Living people
Cours Florent alumni
French male film actors
French male models
French people of Moroccan-Berber descent